Hosea Kutako International Airport (also known as HKIA)  is the main international airport of Namibia, serving the capital city Windhoek. Located well east of the city, it is Namibia's largest airport with international connections. From its founding in 1965 to the independence of Namibia in 1990, it was named J.G. Strijdom Airport. In 1990 the airport was renamed, in honor of Namibian national hero Hosea Kutako.

History
The airport was opened in 1965 during the era of South African administration, and was then named J.G. Strijdom Airport, after the Nationalist Prime Minister of South Africa. It was renamed Hosea Kutako International Airport following independence in 1990.

Hosea Kutako International Airport was the main hub for Air Namibia. Until recently, the absence of limited, direct international flights to Windhoek has forced passengers to fly via Johannesburg's OR Tambo International Airport, or Cape Town International Airport, resulting in additional transit visa costs, visa processing time taken by respective embassies and longer travel time.  There are around 46 direct flights weekly between Hosea Kutako International Airport and O. R. Tambo International Airport. Menzies Aviation,  an international company registered in the UK was awarded the ground handling service operator at Hosea Kutako International Airport in November 2013. Condor Airlines introduced flights between Frankfurt and Windhoek since November 2014. Since 2016, Qatar Airways, KLM Royal Dutch Airlines and Ethiopian Airlines have started flying to Windhoek. Eurowings, the low-cost subsidiary of Lufthansa, commenced a bi-weekly service from Cologne/Bonn in July 2017. However, in a bid to streamline its long haul operation for the 2019-season, the airline has decided to end both the Cologne/Bonn and Munich routes to Windhoek. In recent schedule updates however, Eurowings Discover introduced daily flights to the Namibian capital since July 2022, as well as daily doubles 3 times weekly including flights to and from Victoria Falls in Zimbabwe and Mbombela in South Africa. As of October 2017, around 315 flights depart and land at HKIA weekly. In August 2017 Air Namibia was granted 5th freedom rights to operate cargo and traffic between Windhoek, Lagos, Nigeria and Accra, Ghana. These destinations were cancelled by the airline in May, 2019. Westair Aviation has commenced scheduled flights April 1, 2018 from Windhoek-Eros. In March 2018, Ethiopian Airlines introduced Africa's first Boeing 787-9 Dreamliner to Namibia. Due to flight performance and headwinds, Airlink in March 2019 has decided to re-direct its technical fuel-stop in Windhoek to Walvis Bay Airport, a move which would accommodate more passengers on the final leg to Saint Helena Airport. 
FlyWestair, a subsidiary of privately owned Westair Aviation introduced scheduled passenger flights between Windhoek and O.R.Tambo International Airport from early November 2020.

In December 2017 Hosea Kutako International Airport (HKIA), Namibia's flagship airport,  hosted officials from the Airport Council International (ACI) APEX partners from the Dublin Airport Authority, Airports Company South Africa, Office National des Aéroports of Morocco, Ghana Airports Company and Airports of Mauritius Company, aiming to establish commitment and ultimately confirm a declaration of ACI APEX Safety Peer-review Programme with the Namibia Airports Company (NAC).

On 10 January 2018, the Namibian Civil Aviation Authority launched the implementation of Africa's first centralised aeronautical database. This technology (Africa-Aeronautical Database or A-CAD), will allow flight planners the option of operating at the press of a button by using various mobile devices and follows the requirements of the International Civil Aviation Organization (ICAO). Kenya Airways in May 2021 signed an interline agreement with South African airline, Airlink, to connect passengers from Nairobi via Johannesburg and Cape Town to Windhoek.

The airport handled 1,574,148 passengers in 2016.

Although Hosea Kutako International Airport is the main airport for international flights to and from Namibia, few domestic flights originate at Hosea Kutako International Airport as those are predominantly handled at the smaller Windhoek Eros Airport, about 4,7 km (2,92 mi) south of Windhoek's central business district. In September 2019, UPS Airlines announced that the company is adding Namibia to its global air-cargo network.

The airport is operated by Namibia Airports Company. Since February 2018, the CEO of the company has been Albertus Aochamub.

In February 2021, Air Namibia which maintained its home base and hub at the airport, ceased operations.

In November 2021, Westair Namibia, the parent company of FlyWestair, rebranded to FlyNamibia.

In July 2022 Air Tanzania with its headquarters in Dar Es Salaam, reveal plans to start flights to the Namibian capital, while CemAir, a low-cost South African carrier, is looking into expanding capacity from Johannesburg's O.R.Tambo airport to Windhoek with 14 weekly flights.South African Airways resumed its post-Covid operation between Johannesburg and Windhoek with daily doubles in December 2022. In October 2022, FlySafair successfully negotiated a new route between Cape Town International Airport and Windhoek. The airline got approval in February 2023 to introduce Johannesburg-Windhoek flights to commence during the third quarter of 2023.

Facilities

Though there are few services available near the field, the Sungate Namibia Business Park is being constructed just outside the airport, which will include car rental facilities, airline catering, a truck stop and bureau de change. Improvements to the terminal building have been the recently refurbished duty free restaurant, TAX refund facilities and public (short and long term) parking area. In February 2014, Namibia Airports Company acquired 11 Merce Rhino fire vehicles, of which 2 are assigned to Hosea Kutako Airport, (a Category 9 airport). This accruement exceed the requirements of the International Civil Aviation Organization's (ICAO) safety standards. Free WiFi is available at the duty free restaurant.

The 214 square meters "Amushe"-business lounge was opened in September 2016, comfortably accommodating 55 passengers at a time.

Expansion

The Namibia Airports Company (NAC) is in the planning stages of constructing a new airport complete with aerodrome classification of category 4F (of the International Aviation Organization (ICAO) Aerodrome Reference Code in terms of Annex 14 of ICAO). This new development would render the airport to accommodate multiple wide-bodied code F aircraft. This project would require a new runway, including taxiways/ aprons. The NAC envisages a newly constructed terminal building that would include separate VIP check-in/ ancillary facilities. A new traffic control tower and fire station would complete the project.
In November 2017, the Namibian Government and the Vice Minister of China, Qian Keming, signed an economic and technical cooperation agreement, which will see China offer around 30 million U.S. dollars for part of the N$900m/78 km dual carriageway between the airport and Windhoek. In May 2018 a spokesperson for Namibia Airports Company announced that the arrivals- and check-in hall, the luggage handling area, the security screening point will be temporarily improved. With airport traffic increasing, the need for a new terminal, runway and apron has been prioritised. In September 2019 a local building contractor, Nexus Building Contractor, initiated the Congestion Alleviation project. This N$250 million project targets to double the handling capacity to accommodate increased passenger numbers up until 2030.
The project also includes the construction of a new arrival hall, expansion of the current departure hall, and increasing the security screening points.

Airlines and destinations

The following airlines operate regular scheduled services at the airport:

Passenger

Some Eurowings Discover flights operate between Windhoek and Victoria Falls/Mbombela. The airline has full traffic rights to transport passengers between Windhoek and Victoria Falls/Mbombela.

Cargo

Statistics

Ground transportation
The airport operates shuttle services into Windhoek.

See also
 South African Airways Flight 228

References

External links 

 "Hosea Kokuto International Airport."  Namibian Directorate of Civil Aviation

Airports in Namibia
Buildings and structures in Khomas Region
1965 establishments in South West Africa
Airports established in 1965